Party of Development and Consolidation of Moldova (PDCM) is a political party in Moldova led by former Prime Minister Ion Chicu.

History 

On 31 March 2021, Ion Chicu announced in his telegram channel about the creation of a new political project - the "Party of Development and Consolidation of Moldova".

On 17 April 2021, the party successfully passed the registration procedure.

In May 2021, the party announced that it would participate in the 2021 parliamentary election. On 12 June 2021, the party was registered for the elections under number 12.

In the election, the party received 0.43% of the vote. 6,311 citizens of Moldova voted for this political party.

At the end of August 2022, party leader Ion Chicu welcomed the initiative of the founder of the Democratic Party of Moldova, Dumitru Diacov, to create a centrist bloc

Ideology 

On 31 March 2021, Chicu stated that the main goal of the party was to create all conditions for the integration of the Republic of Moldova into the European Union (EU).

On April 17, Ion Chicu called the party a political formation that shares the Christian democratic political doctrine and is centre-right.

Leadership 

 President – Ion Chicu
 Vice Presidents – Anatol Usatîi, Alexandru Holostenco, Diana Dicusari, Alexandru Botnari and Vlad Castraveț
 Secretary General – Viorica Dumbrăveanu

References 

Political parties established in 2021
Political parties in Moldova